Shahapur Assembly constituency is one of the twenty four constituencies of Maharashtra Vidhan Sabha located in the Thane district. It is reserved for ST candidates. There is a Shahapur Assembly constituency in Karnataka as well.

It is a part of the Bhiwandi (Lok Sabha constituency)(ST) along with five other assembly constituencies, viz Bhiwandi Rural(ST), Bhiwandi East, Bhiwadi West, Kalyan West and Murbad.

List of Members of Legislative Assembly

Election results

Assembly Elections 2009

Assembly Elections 2014

Assembly Elections 2019

See also
Shahpur (disambiguation)

References

Assembly constituencies of Thane district
Assembly constituencies of Maharashtra